A by-election for the seat of Canterbury in the New South Wales Legislative Assembly was held on 24 February 1865 because of the resignation of John Lucas, who had been elected to both Canterbury, and Hartley.

Dates

Results

John Lucas resigned.

See also
Electoral results for the district of Canterbury
List of New South Wales state by-elections

References

1865 elections in Australia
New South Wales state by-elections
1860s in New South Wales